Austroplex is a genus of horse flies in the family Tabanidae.

Species
Austroplex brevipalpis (Macquart, 1848)
Austroplex chrysophilus (Walker, 1848)
Austroplex goldfinchi Mackerras, 1955

References

Tabanidae
Brachycera genera
Diptera of Australasia